This is a list of all the men's Grand Slam singles finals in tennis. From the 1877 Wimbledon Championship up to and including the 2023 Australian Open, there have been 480 finals contested between 273 different men, with 152 champions emerging.

Chronological list

Amateur era

Open Era

Longest finals

Overall

Per tournament
 2012 Australian Open final between Djokovic and Nadal. (5H:53M)
 1982 French Open final between Wilander and Vilas. (4H:42M)
 2019 Wimbledon final between Djokovic and Federer. (4H:57M)
 1988 US Open final between Wilander and Lendl, and 2012 between Murray and Djokovic. (4H:54M)

First-timer finals 
There have been 47 Grand Slam finals contested between first-time finalists (14 in the Open Era):

All-countrymen finals (Open Era) 
Seven countries (Australia, United States, Sweden, Czechoslovakia, Germany, Spain, Argentina) have had two countrymen play in a final in the Open Era.

See also
 List of Grand Slam men's singles champions
 List of Australian Open singles finalists during the Open Era
 List of French Open singles finalists during the Open Era
 List of Wimbledon singles finalists during the Open Era
 List of US Open singles finalists during the Open Era
 List of Grand Slam women's singles finals

References

finals

Grand Slam